Novoye is a rural locality (a village) in Kubenskoye Rural Settlement, Vologodsky District, Vologda Oblast, Russia. The population was 230 as of 2002.

Geography 
The distance to Vologda is 43.5 km, to Kubenskoye is 12 km. Gorka-Nikolskaya is the nearest rural locality.

References 

Rural localities in Vologodsky District